The Bunbury Belle was a passenger train operated by the Western Australian Government Railways between Perth and Bunbury via the South Western line from June 1964 until July 1975.

History
The Bunbury Belle commenced operating on 6 June 1964 between Perth and Bunbury with Wildflower class railcars. It ceased on 27 July 1975, being replaced by road coaches. It operated on weekends only.

References

See also
The Shopper

Named passenger trains of Western Australia
Railway services introduced in 1964
Railway services discontinued in 1975
1964 establishments in Australia
1975 disestablishments in Australia
Discontinued railway services in Australia